Per Mikael Christiansson (21 June 1961 – 18 January 2023) was a Swedish competitive cyclist. He competed in the individual road race and the team time trial events at the 1984 Summer Olympics.

Christiansson died from cancer on 18 January 2023, at the age of 61.

References

External links
 

1961 births
2023 deaths
Swedish male cyclists
Olympic cyclists of Sweden
Cyclists at the 1984 Summer Olympics
Sportspeople from Skåne County